was a Japanese politician.

Political life 

Nakao was a member of Liberal Democratic Party.
Nakao was elected to the Diet of Japan in 1967.

Death 

Nakao died on 18 November 2018, aged 88.

References

|-

|-

|-

|-

1930 births
2018 deaths
Liberal Democratic Party (Japan) politicians
Government ministers of Japan
Members of the House of Representatives (Japan)